Shubham Ranjane (born 26 March 1994) is an Indian first-class cricketer who plays for Goa. He made his first-class debut for Mumbai in the 2016–17 Ranji Trophy on 21 November 2016.

In December 2018, he was bought by the Rajasthan Royals in the player auction for the 2019 Indian Premier League. He was released by the Rajasthan Royals ahead of the 2020 IPL auction.

References

External links
 

1994 births
Living people
Indian cricketers